Stan Keller ( Stanley Keller Grubb, (1907–1990) was an American bandleader, composer, arranger, and woodwind player who led his own orchestra — Stan Keller and His Orchestra. Keller was a member of the original Pennsylvanians, the California Nighthawks, and orchestras led by Charlie Kerr, Charles Previn, Josef Pasternack, Earl Bernnett, Marshall Van Poole, Harry James, and Carmen Cavallaro.  His fellow members in the Charles Kerr Orchestra included Tommy Dorsey, Eddie Lang and Joe Venuti.  Keller was also a member of the Townsmen, a quartet (vibes, guitar, saxophone, bass) which played at the Warwick Hotel. Photos of the Townsmen were often featured on the covers of sheet music that the group performed.

Stan Keller Orchestra 

Stan Keller and His Orchestra performed in the 1940s at New York venues that included an 11-month engagement the Stork Club (1944–45), the Waldorf, the Essex House, the Copacabana, and the Columbia Room at Hotel Astor.  While performing at the Stork, Sherman Billingsley, the proprietor, often referred to Keller's group as the "Ork of Stork" ("ork" being colloquial for "orchestra").  Members of his orchestra included Liberace (piano), Bob Hames (guitar) and Carmen Cavallaro (piano).  Sonny Werblin of MCA booked Stan Keller and His Orchestra at the Hotel Astor with five radio broadcasts a week, coast-to-coast, on the CBS network.

Selected compositions 
All compositions below were originally scored for and performed by The Townsmen, a quartet consisting of a guitar player, a bass player, a saxophonist, and a vibraphonist.

 "Pikes Peak Polka", music by Stan Keller
 "Hop, Skip and Jump (Honey Hurry to Me)", music by Stan Keller and Jerry Livingston, words by Al Hoffman and Milton Drake ( Druckman; b. 1916, New York City)
 Publishers:
 Sony Tunes Inc.
 Al Hoffman Songs, Inc.
 Hallmark Music Co., Inc.
 Empire Music Company, 1650 Broadway, New York
Recorded by Gene Krupa and his Orchestra, Anita O'Day, vocals, Columbia, New York City, Oct. 24, 1945 (Record Catalog No. 1035342)

 "Hop, Skip and Jump" has been re-released on the following CDs' 1995: 1946 Live! (Jazz Hour)
 1999: Complete Capitol Recordings of Gene Krupa and Harry James (Mosaic Records)
 2000: Gene Krupa: Legendary Big Bands Series (Castle Pulse)
 2001: Big Band Legends (Direct Source)
 2002: 1945-1946 (Classics)
 2004: Gene Krupa (Platinum Disc)
 2005: Gene Krupa/Stan Kenton (Platinum Disc)
 Also recorded by Artie Shaw
 Also recorded by Bud Freeman with The DeMarco Sisters

 "Chérie", words and music by Al Hoffman, Stan Keller, and Jerry Livingston (©Feb 17, 1946; EU7368)
 "Temp'ramental You, Sentimental Me", words and music by Eugene West, Bert Mann, and Stanley Keller
 Publishers:
 Keller Music Company, 1619 Broadway, New York (©1943)
 Will Lewis Music Company Inc. (arrangement by Van Alexander for 16 piece orchestra)
 "That Wonderful Moment"
 "Don't Say You're Sorry"
 "Jo Anne", by Al Hoffman and Stan Keller
 "Jukebox Serenade"

 Biography 
Stanley Keller Grubb's parents were Benjamin Franklin Grubb (b. 1873), a steam shovel operator in Birdsboro, Pennsylvania and Elizabeth (née Keller) Grubb (b. 1872).  The family descended from John Grubb, who came to the Delaware Valley from Cornwall in 1677.  The youngest of four children, Stan mastered the clarinet, all saxophones, flute, piccolo, oboe, English horn, and bassoon.  He performed with the Philadelphia Orchestra at age 13.

About 1925, Stan married Ione Dorothy Renfro, (b. Aug. 1, 1904, Texas; d. Mar 1981, Oklahoma City).  They had two children: Robert Stanley Grubb (b. 1930) and  Laura Lou Saxton,  Grubb (b. 1932; d. 1962 Alaska).  Stan and Ione divorced in about 1933.  Stan remarried to Marietta P. Livingston (1913–1963), who also sang with Stan 's Orchestra.

After World War II, a variety of economic factors led to the decline of big band, according to a Denver Post interview with Keller — factors that included (i) a rise in living and travel expenses, (ii) the advent of television, (iii) the diminishing power of radio, and (iv) shifting musical tastes.  Keller couldn't make a living the way he was used to, so he moved to Colorado Springs in 1946, where we remained until 1986.  He fell in love with the area after playing at Copper Grove at the old Antlers Hotel in 1945.  For the ensuing 40 years in Colorado Springs, Keller played at the Garden of the Gods Club, the Tavern at The Broadmoor resort, and the New Terrace at the old Antlers Hotel.

In Colorado Springs, he owned and operated Stan Keller's Dress Wear, Keller's Camera Craft, and the Ute Trading Post.  In 1964, Stan Keller married a third time to Cecelia Helen Zika, '' Stumph (b. 1909, Willow Lake, SD; d. 2002, Lakewood, Colorado), who used Stan's real surname, Grubb.  She was the widow of Robert Francis Zika (b. 1909 Cedar Rapids, Iowa; d. 1953, Boulder, CO), a portrait photographer and band leader.   Stan's death records (Social Security Death Index) used his stage surname, Keller.  He is buried at Evergreen Cemetery, Colorado Springs, next to his second wife, Marietta P. Keller Grubb.

References 

Big band bandleaders
American jazz clarinetists
American jazz saxophonists
American male saxophonists
American jazz bandleaders
1907 births
1990 deaths
Deaths from lung cancer
Burials at Evergreen Cemetery (Colorado Springs, Colorado)
20th-century American saxophonists
20th-century American male musicians
American male jazz musicians